Yulia Sergeevna Deulina (born 14 April 1984 in Krasnogorsk, Russian SSR, Soviet Union) is a Russian ice hockey forward.

International career
Deulina was selected for the Russia national women's ice hockey team in the 2010 Winter Olympics. She did not record a point in five games.

Career statistics

International career

References

External links
Eurohockey.com Profile
Sports-Reference Profile

1984 births
Living people
People from Krasnogorsk, Moscow Oblast
Ice hockey players at the 2010 Winter Olympics
Olympic ice hockey players of Russia
Russian women's ice hockey forwards
Sportspeople from Moscow Oblast
20th-century Russian women
21st-century Russian women